George Marshall Parkhouse (May 13, 1900 – August 24, 1967) was a Democratic member of both the Texas House of Representatives and the Texas Senate from District 8 Dallas County. He did this despite having lost his left arm and left leg in a childhood accident.

He served in the House from 1933 to 1935 (43rd term) and from 1943 to 1951 (48th–51st terms). He was elected to serve in the Senate in 1950 and held the position from 1951 until his death in 1967 (52nd–60th terms).

O.H. "Ike" Harris, a Republican member of the Texas House of Representatives, won a special election in 1967 to succeed Parkhouse.

References

1900 births
1967 deaths
People from Dallas
American amputees
Democratic Party members of the Texas House of Representatives
Democratic Party Texas state senators
20th-century American politicians